The 1977–78 Iraqi National Clubs First Division was the 4th season of the competition since its foundation in 1974. Al-Minaa won their first national league title, winning the competition without defeat and becoming the first team from outside Baghdad to win the Premier League.

Name changes 
 Al-Baladiyat merged with Amanat Al-Asima to form Al-Amana.

League table

Results

Season statistics

Top scorers

Hat-tricks 

Notes
4 Player scored 4 goals

References

External links
 Iraq Football Association

Iraqi Premier League seasons
Iraq
1